This article is an incomplete list of wars and conflicts involving Belgium and its colonial empire.

See also
 List of wars in the Low Countries until 1560 – includes wars on the present territory of Belgium until 1560.
 List of wars in the southern Low Countries (1560–1829) – includes wars on the present territory of Belgium, including the Southern Netherlands (Spanish Netherlands & Austrian Netherlands), the Principality of Liège, the Princely Abbey of Stavelot-Malmedy,, the Prince-Bishopric of Cambrésis and the Imperial City of Cambray, the Duchy of Bouillon and smaller states.
 List of wars involving the Netherlands (1815–1839) – includes colonial wars in which the south participated as part of the United Kingdom of the Netherlands 
 History of Belgium
 Belgian Army

References

Wars
Belgium
Wars